Charles Goddard may refer to:

 Charles Goddard (playwright) (1879–1951), American playwright and screenwriter
 Charles Goddard (priest) (1770–1848), Anglican priest
 Charles Backus Goddard (1796–1864), American lawyer and politician
 Charles Goddard (politician) (1825–?), American lawyer, politician and diplomat